AfterMASH is an American sitcom television series produced as the first spin-off and a continuation of M*A*S*H that aired on CBS from September 26, 1983 to May 31, 1985. It was developed as the sequel series as it takes place immediately following the end of the Korean War and chronicles the postwar adventures of three main characters from the original series: Colonel Sherman T. Potter (played by Harry Morgan), Sergeant Maxwell Klinger (played by Jamie Farr) and Father John Mulcahy (played by William Christopher). M*A*S*H supporting cast-member Kellye Nakahara joined them, albeit off-camera, as the voice of the hospital's public address system. Rosalind Chao rounded out the starring cast as Soon-Lee Klinger, a Korean refugee whom Klinger met, fell in love with, and married in the M*A*S*H series finale "Goodbye, Farewell and Amen".

Synopsis

Season one
In the one-hour pilot episode "September of '53"/"Together Again", Colonel Potter returned home from Korea to his wife Mildred (Barbara Townsend) in Hannibal, Missouri. He soon found physically enforced retirement stifling, and Mildred suggested he return to work. Potter was soon hired by the bombastic and bureaucratic hospital administrator Mike D'Angelo (John Chappell) as the chief of staff at General Pershing Veterans' Hospital ("General General"), located in a fictional version of River Bend, Missouri.

Max Klinger had found himself in trouble with the law in Toledo. Colonel Potter wrote to him and offered him a job as his administrative assistant. Klinger's nemesis at General General was D'Angelo's executive secretary Alma Cox (Brandis Kemp), a mean-spirited woman who was forever trying to "get the goods" on him, from rifling through his desk to giving him just one day to prepare for a civil service exam, the latter of which, despite her underhanded efforts, he still manages to pass.

Father Mulcahy, whose hearing was damaged in the final episode of M*A*S*H, was suffering from depression and drinking heavily. Potter arranged for Mulcahy to receive an operation at another VA Hospital in St. Louis. After his hearing was surgically corrected, he stopped drinking and joined Potter and Klinger at "General General" as its Catholic chaplain.

Also on hand was the idealistic, talented, and often hungry young resident surgeon Gene Pfeiffer (Jay O. Sanders), attractive secretary Bonnie Hornbeck (Wendy Schaal), who had an eye for Klinger, and old-timer Bob Scannell (Patrick Cranshaw) who served under then-Sergeant Potter in World War I and was now a hospital resident of 35 years (thanks to his exposure to mustard gas). Unlike the other patients and staff who addressed Potter by his retired rank of Colonel, Scannell called him "Sarge" at Potter's request.

Halfway through the first season, Dr. Mark Boyer (David Ackroyd) was introduced as a hardened veteran who lost a leg in Korea and had a hard time adjusting to civilian life. Despite only having signed on for two episodes, his character began appearing more often toward the end of the season, so often that Dr. Pfeiffer was suddenly pulled from the cast after Dr. Boyer's debut episode.

The only other main character from the original series to appear on AfterMASH was Radar (played by Gary Burghoff), who appeared in a first season two-part episode. As Potter, Klinger, and Mulcahy prepare to head to Iowa for Radar's wedding, Radar shows up in a panic at Potter's house in Missouri, believing his intended fiancée has cheated on him in "It Had to Be You". The Radar character later appeared in a pilot called W*A*L*T*E*R, in which Radar moved from Iowa to St. Louis, after his wife left him on his wedding night, and he became a police officer. (The series was never picked up, and the pilot was aired in July 1984 as a TV special on CBS exclusively in the Eastern and Central time zones; the show was pre-empted in Pacific and Mountain time zones by the 1984 Democratic National Convention. The pilot/special was broadcast by CBS only once.)

The season included home scenes with the Potters, most notably when they were deluged with guests in "Thanksgiving of '53", and Potter tried to keep the phone occupied so Klinger could not call his relatives, who were on the way over to surprise him; this episode also marked the only onscreen appearance of Potter's oft-mentioned daughter, Evvy Ennis, and Potter's grandson, Corey. One of the season's standout episodes was the Emmy-nominated "Fall Out", where Potter and Pfeiffer considered leaving General General, but reconsidered when they linked the leukemia seen in a patient with exposure to atomic testing; writer-director Larry Gelbart received a Peabody Award for this episode. The season closed in March with Klinger being arrested for assaulting a real estate agent as pregnant Soon Lee went into labor. In May, CBS announced the show was renewed for a second season.

Season two
Season Two opened with Klinger escaping from the River Bend County Jail to attend the birth of his child and remaining a fugitive until a judge sent him to the psychiatric unit at General General, where Klinger feigned insanity to avoid prison and the Potters took in Soon Lee and the (as yet unnamed) baby. Mike D'Angelo was transferred to Montana and was replaced by smarmy new administrator Wally Wainwright (Peter Michael Goetz). Anne Pitoniak was brought in to replace Barbara Townsend as Mildred Potter. David Ackroyd was promoted to a regular cast member after multiple guest appearances in the second half of the first season. An attractive new psychiatrist, Dr. Lenore Dudziak (Wendy Girard), arrived to begin the daunting task of evaluating Klinger, while Potter was horrified that Wainwright assigned Alma Cox as his new secretary.

Relationship with M*A*S*H

Only a few of the characters both main and recurring from the original series were ever mentioned in the sequel series. Hawkeye was mentioned in a voice-over narration by Father John Mulcahy in the one-hour pilot episode. Major Frank Burns was mentioned both times by Colonel Sherman Potter, one in the first season episode "Chief of Staff" and another one in the second season episode. In a season 1 episode titled "Chief of Staff", Colonel Sherman Potter's office was redecorated with all of the items from the 4077th MASH unit including a portrait from the Season 10, Episode 21 of M*A*S*H titled "Picture This" and it would remain that way throughout the sequel series. In a season 2 episode called "Madness to His Method", Colonel Sherman Potter writes to Major Sidney Freedman who had accepted a post at the University of Chicago after leaving Korea and the army talking about the episode's situation to an unseen character. Edward Winter who played Colonel Samuel Flagg in the original series had resurfaced and reprised his role in a season 2 episode titled "Trials".

While the AfterMASH was being produced and renewed for a second season, plans were made for Alan Alda and other actors from the original series to appear in the show as guest stars but it was canceled before the plans were finalized.

Characters
Note: Similar to the list on the M*A*S*H page, this table counts double episodes as 2 episodes, and therefore there are 22 episodes in the first season (with the first episode being double length), and 9 episodes in the second season, the total being 31.

Production

Writing
AfterMASH made frequent references to M*A*S*H, and likewise featured storylines that highlighted the horrors and suffering of war, from the non-combat perspective of a veterans' hospital. The series was canceled after twenty-nine broadcast episodes. "Wet Feet", the thirtieth episode, was never aired.

Broadcast
AfterMASH premiered in late 1983 in the same Monday at 9 p.m. time slot as its predecessor, M*A*S*H. It finished at #15 out of 101 network shows for the 1983–1984 season according to Nielsen Media Research television ratings. For its second season, CBS moved the show to Tuesday nights at 8 opposite NBC's Top 10 hit The A-Team, and launched a marketing campaign featuring illustrations by Sanford Kossin of Max Klinger in a female nurse's uniform shaving off Mr. T's signature mohawk, theorizing that AfterMASH would take a large portion of the A-Team audience. In fact, however, the opposite occurred, as AfterMASH's ratings plummeted to near the bottom of the television rankings, leading to its cancellation just nine episodes into its second season, finishing at only #72 out of 77 shows for the 1984-1985 season. Meanwhile, The A-Team continued until 1987, with 97 episodes.

Episodes

Season 1 (1983–1984)

Season 2 (1984–1985)

Reception
Critics were mostly negative about the program. In 1999, Time magazine listed the show as one of the 100 worst ideas of the century, and in 2002, TV Guide listed it as the seventh-worst TV series ever.

Notes

References

External links
 
 AfterMASH – MASH4077TV.com – Article about AfterMASH
 Article about Larry Gelbart's role in the development of the series
 1983 People article on the creation of the series

1983 American television series debuts
1985 American television series endings
1980s American sitcoms
CBS original programming
American television spin-offs
English-language television shows
1980s American medical television series
1980s American workplace comedy television series
Television shows set in Missouri
Television series by 20th Century Fox Television
Television series set in the 1950s
Television series set in 1953
M*A*S*H